Line art or line drawing is any image that consists of distinct straight lines or curves placed against a background (usually plain), without gradations in shade (darkness) or hue (color) to represent two-dimensional or three-dimensional objects. Line art can use lines of different colors, although line art is usually monochromatic.

Techniques
Line art emphasizes form and drawings, of several (few) constant widths (as in technical illustrations), or of freely varying widths (as in brush work or engraving). Line art may tend towards realism (as in much of Gustave Doré's work), or it may be a caricature, cartoon, ideograph, or glyph.

Form
One of the most fundamental elements of art is the line. An important feature of a line is that it indicates the edge of a two-dimensional (flat) shape or a three-dimensional form.  A shape can be indicated by means of an outline, and a three-dimensional form can be indicated by contour lines.

History
Before the development of photography and of halftones, line art was the standard format for illustrations to be used in print publications, using black ink on white paper. Using either stippling or hatching, shades of gray could also be simulated.

Image gallery

See also
Lineography
Old master print
Screentone
Hatching
Stippling
Halftone
Moiré pattern
Ben-Day dots
Dithering
Grayscale
Perspective (graphical)
Vanishing point

Notes

External links

Graphic design
Visual arts genres